True crime is a genre of non-fiction books, magazines, websites, films, TV shows, and podcasts. These various media forms contain dramatic retellings and realistic visual representations of crimes, most popularly the slayings of serial killers. 

True Crime may also refer to:

Television
 True Crime (TV channel), a British crime-based TV channel
 True Crime with Aphrodite Jones, a U.S. documentary TV show
 "True Crime" (Only Murders in the Building), an episode of the 2021 mystery-comedy TV series Only Murders in the Building
 72 Hours: True Crime, a Canadian TV show, documentary show about the first 3 days in a  crime
 Law & Order: True Crime, a U.S. TV show, dramatizations of true crimes
 True Crime Network, an American broadcast network

Online
 Casefile True Crime Podcast, a true crime podcast series airing since January 2016
 Morbid: A True Crime Podcast, an anthology podcast
 True Crime Zine, an online literary magazine about true crime books

Other uses
True Crime (1996 film), a 1996 movie starring Alicia Silverstone
True Crime (1999 film), a 1999 movie starring and directed by Clint Eastwood
True Crime (album), a 1999 live album by Zeke
 "True Crime", a song by White Zombie from Let Sleeping Corpses Lie
True Crime (series), a computer and video game series:
True Crime: Streets of LA, a 2003 video game
True Crime: New York City, a 2005 video game (sequel to Streets of LA)
Sleeping Dogs, a 2012 video game, which was at some point developed as True Crime: Hong Kong, by Square Enix

See also

 
 Crime (disambiguation)
 True (disambiguation)

References